"Don't Go" is a song by British synth-pop band Yazoo (known in the US and Canada as Yaz). It was released in 1982 as the second single from their debut album, Upstairs at Eric's (20 August 1982). The song peaked at number three on the UK Singles Chart, becoming Yazoo's second top 5 hit. In the US, where the band was known as Yaz, the song was their second big hit on the American dance chart, where it spent two weeks at number one in October 1982. Their first American dance chart hit was "Situation", which had also gone to number one on this chart earlier the same year. The music video for the song features band members Alison Moyet and Vince Clarke in a sort of haunted mansion with Clarke cast in the role of Victor Frankenstein. The song re-entered the UK Dance Chart on 13 December 2009 at number 30, peaking at number 15 on 2 January 2010.

Critical reception
Ian Birch of Smash Hits considered "Don't Go" to be a "sharp successor" to "Only You". He commented: "Vince coaxes a sterling song out of his synthesizer while Alf balances its metallic clip with a deep, emotion-packed vocal that gets better with every hearing".

Formats and track listings
 UK 7" single (Mute 7 YAZ 001)
"Don't Go" – 2:53
"Winter Kills" – 4:02

 US 12" single (Sire 29886-0)
"Don't Go (Re-mix)" – 4:08
"Don't Go (Re-re-mix)" – 4:20
"Winter Kills (album version)" – 4:03

Note 1: "Winter Kills," the B-side to this single, is explicitly listed as "Not re-mixed" and "Not extended" on the album sleeve
Note 2: The US 12" single mis-prints the track lengths on the record, listing the "Re-mix" as 5:08 and the "Re-re-mix" as 3:20

Charts

Weekly charts

Year-end charts

Sales and certifications

Other versions
The following artists have produced covers of or sampled the song:
1993 – Dutch act Boobytrax (aka doop) released a house version of the song. Their version peaked at number 23 in the Netherlands and at number 36 in Sweden.
1995 – British singer Lizzy Mack had a UK number 52 hit with her version of the song.
2006 – Nouvelle Vague covered the song on their album Bande à Part.
2009 – The Kid Sister song "Big N Bad" from the album Ultraviolet contains interpolations of "Don't Go".
2009 – Smoove & Turrell covered "Don't Go" on their album Antique Soul.
2010 – Georgian-Greek singer Tamta sampled the synths of the song on her single "Fotia".
2011 – Slow Moving Millie covered the song on her album Renditions.
2019 – Estonian DJ Madison Mars sampled the synths of the song for his house song "New Vibe Who Dis" featuring Indianapolis Singer Little League.
2019 – English DJ Riton and Dutch DJ Oliver Heldens sampled the synths of the song on their future house song "Turn Me On", featuring British singer Vula.
2021 – English post-punk music duo Sleaford Mods covered the song as it has been a fan-favourite of the duo's live sets for some time.
2022 - Babert use a sample of the synthesizer main riff in his song "Can't Stop Now".

Starting Rock featuring Diva Avari version

The song was covered and remixed by French project Starting Rock featuring Diva Avari. It was released in December 2006 as a single and had modest success in Europe. It reached the top 10 in Finland.

Music video
The music video depicts a male at a club dancing with women. He meets Diva Avari, who has her eyes set on him and he cannot escape her throughout their time at the club.

Charts

See also
List of number-one dance singles of 1982 (U.S.)

References

1982 songs
1982 singles
1999 singles
2006 singles
Yazoo (band) songs
Songs written by Vince Clarke
Song recordings produced by Eric Radcliffe
Song recordings produced by Daniel Miller
Ultratop 50 Singles (Flanders) number-one singles